Vytautas Petras Plečkaitis (born October 16, 1950) is a Lithuanian politician.  In 1990 he was among those who signed the Act of the Re-Establishment of the State of Lithuania.

References
 Biographical note
 Parliamentary biography

1950 births
Living people
Ambassadors of Lithuania to Ukraine
Knights of the Order of Merit of the Republic of Poland
Members of the Seimas
People from Kalvarija, Lithuania
Recipients of the Order of Prince Yaroslav the Wise, 3rd class